Jennifer Enid McDonald (born 18 July 1949 in Whangarei) is a retired field hockey player from New Zealand, who was a member of the national team that finished sixth at the 1984 Summer Olympics in Los Angeles. 

Born Jennifer Bint, she grew up in the farming locality of Maungakaramea, in Northland. She studied teaching in Auckland, then taught at the primary school in Outram, near Dunedin, where she met her future husband, Rex McDonald.
 
Jenny McDonald played 192 matches for the national hockey team from 1971 to 1985, including 94 tests, and captained the team from 1980 to 1985. She was the only New Zealander selected in a World XI that played the world champion Netherlands in a one-off encounter in Scotland in 1980. She retired from hockey at 53 after breaking her wrist. Later, she became President of the Otago Hockey Association, then chair of Southern Regional Hockey.

In 1996 she was inducted into the New Zealand Sports Hall of Fame. The annual national schoolgirls' hockey tournament is played for the Jenny McDonald Cup. She was awarded life membership of the New Zealand Hockey Federation in 2002.

She retired from teaching in 2014 after being principal of Elmgrove School in Mosgiel, Otago, for 10 years.

References

External links
 

1949 births
Living people
New Zealand female field hockey players
Olympic field hockey players of New Zealand
Field hockey players at the 1984 Summer Olympics
Field hockey players from Whangārei
Heads of schools in New Zealand